Johnny E. Jensen (born 1947) is a Danish-American cinematographer. He is best known for the films Rambling Rose, Grumpy Old Men, and Rosewood, and the television film Into the Badlands for which he received a Primetime Emmy nomination.

Jensen was born in  Copenhagen, Denmark and immigrated to the United States at age 20.

Filmography

Films
Material Girls (2006)
The Game of Their Lives (2005)
WiseGirls (2002)
Morgan's Ferry (2001)
The Ladies Man (2000)
Rosewood (1997)
Three Wishes (1995)
Angie (1994)
Grumpy Old Men (1993)
Lost in Yonkers (1993)
Benefit of the Doubt (1993)
Rambling Rose (1991)

Television
Heartland (2007, seven episodes)
Deceit
Two Against Time (2002)
The Ponder Heart (2001)
 The Flamingo Rising (2001)
 Swing Vote (1999)
Crazy in Love (1992)
Into the Badlands (1991)
 Bare Essentials (1991)

References

External links
 

American cinematographers
Danish cinematographers
Living people
1947 births